The table below lists the census metropolitan areas and agglomerations in British Columbia by population, using data from the Canada 2016 Census. Each entry is identified as a census metropolitan area (CMA) or a census agglomeration (CA) as defined by Statistics Canada. Any other census subdivision that comprises at least 10 percent of the CMA or CA population is listed in parentheses.

A city's metropolitan area in colloquial or administrative terms may be different from its CMA as defined by Statistics Canada, resulting in differing populations. Such is the case with the Greater Toronto Area and the National Capital Region, in the separate provinces of Ontario, where their metropolitan populations are notably higher than their respective CMA populations. Statistics Canada listed 19 CMAs and CAs at the Canada 2016 Census.

Metropolitan areas

See also 

List of Canadian census agglomerations by province or territory
List of census agglomerations in Canada
List of municipalities in British Columbia
List of population centres in British Columbia
Population of Canada by year

References 

Metropolitan areas of British Columbia
British Columbia metropolitan areas
British Columbia